State Secretary or Secretary of State is a higher official, who leads Estonian Riigikantselei. Since 2018, State Secretary is Taimar Peterkop.

State Secretaries

References

External links
 Secretary of State, riigikantselei.ee

Politics of Estonia